Buleleng International Airport, also known as New Bali International Airport, is a proposed airport in Jembrana Regency, Bali, that would replace the unexpandable Ngurah Rai International Airport.

The project is estimated to cost US$110 million.

See also 
North Bali International Airport, another proposed site.

References

Proposed airports in Indonesia
Airports in Bali